The Clearstream Affair (French title: L'Enquête) is a 2014 thriller film directed by Vincent Garenq, based on the Clearstream scandal in 2001.

Cast 
 Gilles Lellouche as Denis Robert 
 Charles Berling as Judge Renaud Van Ruymbeke
 Laurent Capelluto as Imah Lahoud
 Florence Loiret Caille  as Géraldine Robert  
 Christian Kmiotek as Régis Hempel 
 Grégoire Bonnet as Laurent Beccaria 
 Antoine Gouy as Florian Bourges 
 Eric Naggar as Jean-Louis Gergorin
 Laurent D'Olce as Vincent Peillon
 Gilles Arbona as General Rondot
 Hervé Falloux as Dominique de Villepin 
 Thomas Séraphine as Arnaud Montebourg
 Sarah Suco as The Assistant

Accolades

Other works 
Vincent Garenq's other films include
 Baby Love, 2008,
 Comme les autres, 2009,
 Guilty (Présumé coupable), 2011, 
 Kalinka (Au nom de ma fille), 2016

References

External links 
 

2014 films
2014 thriller films
2010s French-language films
French thriller films
Belgian thriller films
Films based on French novels
Thriller films based on actual events
Luxembourgian thriller films
French-language Belgian films
French-language Luxembourgian films
2010s French films